The 2008–09 season was Blackpool F.C.'s 101st season (98th consecutive) in the Football League. It was also their second consecutive season in the Championship, the second tier of English football. They finished sixteenth.

D. J. Campbell, on loan from Leicester City, was the club's top scorer, with nine goals overall.

Simon Grayson resigned as manager on 23 December, to become the new manager of Leeds United. His assistant, Tony Parkes, took over as caretaker manager (his seventh such appointment), until the end of the season.

First-team squad
Squad at end of season

Left club during season

Table

Pre-season

Season proper

Football League Championship

League table

Results

In summary

By matchday

In detail

FA Cup

Football League Cup

Squad statistics

Players used: 44
Goals scored: 46

Transfers

Transfers in

Loans in

Transfers out

Loans out

References

Blackpool F.C. seasons
Blackpool